AQM or Aqm may refer to:

 Active queue management, a technique for Internet routers that consists in dropping or marking packets before its queue is full
 Abstract Query Model, a model for the structure and evaluation semantics of a query in JCR according to JSR-283; See Content repository API for Java
 Air quality management, in environmental engineering

See also
 Al-Qaeda in the Islamic Maghreb (AQIM or AQMI), a radical Islamist militia which aims to overthrow the Algerian government and institute an Islamic state
 AQM missiles, for example the Northrop AQM-35